Sir Chloe is an American indie rock band from Vermont. The group consists of Dana Foote, Teddy O'Mara, Palmer Foote, Emma Welch, and Austin Holmes.

History
Sir Chloe began in 2017, when lead singer Dana Foote was a senior at Bennington College. Foote studied music composition. Instead of writing a thesis, Foote opted to create a concert consisting only of original music. She did this by forming a band with her brother and close friends. Sir Chloe gained widespread popularity when their song "Michelle" went viral on the video sharing application TikTok. The band released their debut EP, Party Favors, in 2020. Sir Chloe released a cover of Lou Reed's "Femme Fatale" and a new version of "Michelle" in 2021. 

In 2022, Sir Chloe released non-album singles "Company" and "Mercy".  In 2023, they announced their debut studio album I Am The Dog and shared lead single "Hooves" on February 23, featuring writing and production contributions by John Congleton and Sarah Tudzin of Illuminati Hotties. I Am The Dog will be released on May 19, 2023. They will tour with Beck and Phoenix during the following summer.

Influences
Foote cites Balkan music as well as Cage the Elephant as inspirations for composing music.

Discography

Studio albums

I Am the Dog (23 May 2023; Atlantic Records)

EPs

Party Favors (23 October 2020; Terrible Records)

Singles

"Hooves" (23 February 2023; Atlantic Records)
"Company" (6 May 2022)
"Mercy" (1 March 2022)
"Femme Fatale (The Velvet Underground cover) (8 September 2021)
"La Femme Michelle" (13 July 2021; Terrible Records)
 "Sedona" (16 September 2020)
"July" (29 July 2020; Terrible Records)
"Easy on You" (2020)
"Untie You" (2020)
"Too Close" (19 July 2019; Terrible Records)
"Walk You Home" (21 May 2019; Terrible Records)
"Michelle" (11 April 2019; Terrible Records)
"Animal" (28 February 2019; Terrible Records)

References

Indie rock musical groups from Vermont